Splinter is the second studio album by English electronic band Sneaker Pimps, released on 25 October 1999 through record labels Clean Up and Virgin.

It was the first album to feature founding member and principal songwriter Chris Corner on lead vocals, replacing the band's previous singer Kelli Dayton.

Content 

NME described Splinter as "a staunch refusal to cash in whatsoever on previous fame" and "the band's hangover after the long night of success brought by debut 'Becoming X'. It’s faintly ugly and always a breath away from self-destruction, the vision of a band who've renounced smiling at people they hate and wrestled their collective soul back from the devil."

AllMusic described the album's musical style as "full of trancey, edgy psychedelia, interspersed with moments of blistering rock" and "an intricate album of trip-hop".

Songs recorded during the album sessions but not included on the album are "Diving" and "Unattach", which were included as bonus tracks on the Japanese edition and as B-sides on certain editions of the "Low Five" single, as well as "Virgin" and "Perfect One", B-sides to editions of the "Ten to Twenty" single.

Release 

Splinter was released on 29 October 1999 in the UK, Japan and Europe, through record labels Clean Up and Virgin. Splinter was not released in the United States, unlike the group's other two albums.

Two singles were released from the album: "Low Five" and "Ten to Twenty".

The album reached number 80 in the UK Albums Chart; the single "Low Five" reached number 39 on the UK Singles Chart, while "Ten to Twenty" reached number 56.

The band performed a live version of the album on Scottish TV show Boxed Set in 2000.

Reception 

NME was largely favourable towards the album, singling out Chris Corner's lyrics for praise: "His abstract punctuation-free lyrics have the same bleak power as 'OK Computer' – strangely meaningful without saying anything", and calling Splinter "as compelling as it is claustrophobic". AllMusic, despite giving it a mediocre rating, described it as "a superb disc", "every bit as original as any of their contemporaries" as well as "pleasantly low-key and occasionally brilliant."

Track listing
 "Half Life"
 "Low Five"
 "Lightning Field"
 "Curl"
 "Destroying Angel"
 "Empathy"
 "Superbug"
 "Flowers and Silence"
 "Cute Sushi Lunches"
 "Ten to Twenty"
 "Splinter"
 "Wife by Two Thousand"
 "Diving" (Japanese bonus track)
 "Unattach (Japanese bonus track)

Samples
 "Half Life" sampled Scott Walker's track: "It's Raining Today" (1969)
 "Empathy" sampled both Kronos Quartet's tracks: "Uleg-Khem" and "Laengdans Efter Byfans Mats" (1997) and Cabaret Voltaire's track: "Premonition" (1980)
 "Superbug" sampled Dashiell Hedayat's track: "Cielo Drive/17" (1971)
 "Flowers and Silence" sampled Scott Walker's track: "Big Louise" (1969)
 "Cute Sushi Lunches" sampled both David Sylvian's track: "Brilliant Trees" (1984) and Vangelis' track: "Beaubourg Part 1" (1978)

References

External links

Splinter at Sneaker Pimps Legacy

1999 albums
Sneaker Pimps albums
Art pop albums